Satyrium is a genus of orchid. The Kew plant list for 2010 listed 85 full species as accepted, ignoring synonyms, subspecies and hybrids etc. About ten were still unresolved at the time. Most of the species occur in sub-Saharan Africa and Madagascar. The ranges of four species extend to Asia, mainly in India and Sri Lanka. Hybridization occurs between several species, complicating molecular phylogenetic studies, especially those relying on mitochondrial and chloroplast DNA sequences.

The genus most closely related to Satyrium is presumed to be Pachites, which together with Satyrium makes up the subtribe Satyriinae of the Diseae. Historically other species with helmet-shaped flowers e.g. Aceras, Chamorchis and Platanthera, often were included in the genus Satyrium, but far from belonging in the same genus, they no longer are included even within the Satyriinae, but within the tribe Orchideae. In a 2015 classification of Orchidaceae, Satyrium itself was placed in the subtribe Orchidinae.

Currently accepted species of Satyrium 

Satyrium aberrans  Summerh. 
Satyrium aciculare  van der Niet & P.J.Cribb
Satyrium acuminatum  Lindl.
Satyrium aethiopicum  Summerh.
Satyrium afromontanum  la Croix & P.J.Cribb
Satyrium amblyosaccos  Schltr.
Satyrium amoenum  (Thouars) A.Rich.
Satyrium anomalum  Schltr.
Satyrium baronii  Schltr.
Satyrium bicallosum  Thunb.
Satyrium bicorne  (L.) Thunb.
Satyrium brachypetalum  A.Rich.
Satyrium bracteatum  (L.f.) Thunb.
Satyrium breve  Rolfe
Satyrium buchananii  Schltr.
Satyrium candidum  Lindl.
Satyrium carneum  (Dryand.) Sims
Satyrium carsonii  Rolfe
Satyrium chlorocorys  Rchb.f. ex Rolfe
Satyrium compactum  Summerh.
Satyrium comptum  Summerh.
Satyrium confusum  Summerh.
Satyrium coriifolium  Sw.
Satyrium coriophoroides  A.Rich.
Satyrium crassicaule  Rendle
Satyrium cristatum  Sond.
Satyrium ecalcaratum  Schltr.
Satyrium elongatum  Rolfe
Satyrium erectum  Sw.
Satyrium fimbriatum  Summerh.
Satyrium flavum  la Croix
Satyrium foliosum  Sw.
Satyrium hallackii  Bolus
Satyrium humile  Lindl.
Satyrium johnsonii  Rolfe
Satyrium kermesinum  Kraenzl.
Satyrium kitimboense  Kraenzl.
Satyrium ligulatum  Lindl.
Satyrium longicauda  Lindl.
Satyrium longicolle  Lindl.
Satyrium lupulinum  Lindl.
Satyrium macrophyllum  Lindl.
Satyrium mechowii  Rchb.f.
Satyrium membranaceum  Sw.
Satyrium microcorys  Schltr.
Satyrium microrrhynchum  Schltr.
Satyrium mirum  Summerh.
Satyrium miserum  Kraenzl.
Satyrium monadenum  Schltr.
Satyrium monophyllum  Kraenzl.
Satyrium muticum  Lindl.
Satyrium neglectum  Schltr.
Satyrium neilgherrensis  Fyson
Satyrium nepalense  D.Don
Satyrium odorum  Sond.
Satyrium oliganthum  Schltr.
Satyrium orbiculare  Rolfe
Satyrium outeniquense  Schltr.
Satyrium pallens  S.D.Johnson & Kurzweil
Satyrium paludosum  Rchb.f.
Satyrium parviflorum  Sw.
Satyrium perrieri  Schltr.
Satyrium princeae  Kraenzl.
Satyrium princeps  Bolus
Satyrium pulchrum  S.D.Johnson & Kurzweil
Satyrium pumilum  Thunb.
Satyrium pygmaeum  Sond.
Satyrium retusum  Lindl.
Satyrium rhynchanthoides  Schltr.
Satyrium rhynchanthum  Bolus
Satyrium riparium  Rchb.f.
Satyrium robustum  Schltr.
Satyrium rostratum  Lindl.
Satyrium rupestre  Schltr.
Satyrium sceptrum  Schltr.
Satyrium schimperi  Hochst. ex A.Rich.
Satyrium shirense  Rolfe
Satyrium sphaeranthum  Schltr.
Satyrium sphaerocarpum  Lindl.
Satyrium stenopetalum  Lindl.
Satyrium striatum  Thunb.
Satyrium trinerve  Lindl.
Satyrium volkensii  Schltr.
Satyrium welwitschii  Rchb.f.
Satyrium yunnanense  Rolfe

References

External links 
 
 

 
Orchideae genera